DMA (Dance Music Authority) was a monthly American dance music publication that ran from 1993 to 2003. It originally ceased publishing due to a downturn in advertising revenue.

Background 
Dance Music Authority Magazine (DMA) was based in Tinley Park, Illinois and served as the voice of the dance music community, with articles, interviews and profiles of artistes, DJs and remixers, as well as in-depth record reviews, spotlights on clubs, dance music gear and equipment, and commentary on the genre in general.

Like most independently owned publications, DMA thrived on the support of record labels and advertisers, most of them coming from the dance music industry and from die-hard fans of the genre. But, by 2001, DMA'''s days were numbered as several labels and advertisers began to either scale back or to fold completely. The continuing effects resulted in Hayslett's decision to cease publication in spring 2003.

Today, Dance Music Authority'' continues online at DMAclub.com and is powered by WordPress, where it has become an online-community.

References

External links 

Magazines established in 1993
Magazines disestablished in 2003
Dance music magazines
Bimonthly magazines published in the United States
Music magazines published in the United States
Defunct magazines published in the United States
Online magazines with defunct print editions
1993 establishments in the United States
Magazines published in Illinois